Basari may be:
The Bassari language of Guinea
The Ntcham language of Togo